Puschwitz (German) or Bóšicy (Upper Sorbian) is a municipality in the district of Bautzen, in Saxony, Germany.

It belongs to Upper Lusatia and the settlement area of the Sorbs. The municipality consists of following villages (names given in German/Upper Sorbian):
 Guhra/Hora
 Jeßnitz/Jaseńca
 Lauske/Łusč
 Neu-Jeßnitz/Nowa Jaseńca
 Neu-Lauske/Nowy Łusč
 Neu-Puschwitz/Nowe Bóšicy
 Puschwitz/Bóšicy
 Wetro/Wětrow

References 

Municipalities in Saxony
Populated places in Bautzen (district)